Ernston is a neighborhood in Sayreville in Middlesex County, New Jersey, United States. It was a stop on the Camden and Amboy Railroad.

See also
List of neighborhoods in Sayreville, New Jersey

References

Neighborhoods in Sayreville, New Jersey